The Lake Guardian is a research vessel that serves on the Great Lakes.
She is owned by the United States Environmental Protection Agency. She has three onboard laboratories: multipurpose, chemistry, and biology.

Images

References

External links
Lake Guardian ship website
Visualizing the Great Lakes - ship photo collection, Environmental Protection Agency
National Oceanic and Atmospheric Administration – Research vessel Lake Guardian

Research vessels of the United States
Ships of the United States Environmental Protection Agency
1981 ships
Ships built in Moss Point, Mississippi